The 2022 Alderney general election was to have been held on 26 November 2022 to elect 5 members of the States of Alderney who will serve until 2026.

With only 4 candidates for 5 seats, the four candidates are elected unopposed to serve until 31 December 2026. One seat remains vacant.

Results

References

Elections in Alderney
Alderney
2022 in Guernsey
November 2022 events in Europe